A nipple piercing is a type of body piercing, centered usually at the base of the nipple. It can be pierced at any angle but is usually done horizontally or, less often, vertically. It is also possible to place multiple piercings on top of one another.

History 

The perforation of the nipple to apply jewelry has been practiced by various people throughout history. Male nipple piercing was reported to be done by the Karankawa Native Americans, female nipple piercing is practiced by the Kabyle people in Algeria.

In the western world it potentially dates back to the 14th century. The anthropologist Hans Peter Duerr traces the earliest known practice of female nipple piercing as a fashion statement to the Court of Isabeau of Bavaria (1370 to 1435), queen consort of France, quoting Eduard Fuchs he describes that:  However, these sources are difficult to verify.

There are also references to a fashion for nipple piercing among society women during the Victorian period around 1890. However, the historian Lesley Hall has commented that these can be traced to a few letters published in the magazine Society during 1899, and can be judged as erotic fantasies rather than descriptions of actual activity.

In the late 1970s, the practice was revived by Jim Ward and it was adopted by the BDSM and leather subcultures of the gay community. During the 1980s and early 1990s, the modern primitive movement embraced nipple piercings among other forms of body modification. With its roots in the West Coast of the United States, the modern primitive movement was intrigued by indigenous, so-called "primitive" cultures and adopted various forms of body modification. The mainstream popularity of nipple piercing is partly due to certain 1990s celebrities such as Tommy Lee, Corey Taylor and Lenny Kravitz who publicly displayed their piercings or said that they had them.

Nipple piercing has gained in popularity in the 21st century with a number of celebrities and fashion models having this type of piercing. In addition, many people are motivated to have nipple piercings for personal reasons including self-expression and a desire to feel unique. At least one study has shown that people spend, on average, 1–2 years making the decision to have a piercing.

Healing and after care

Some people have noted that they can take up to a year and a half to heal fully. It is recommended that if stretching a nipple piercing, the piercee waits at least the healing time of their piercings between stretches.

Nipple piercing and sensitivity

Sexual arousal created by areola and nipple stimulation is reported to be enhanced by piercing of the nipple.  Most women claim an increase in sensitivity and arousal after having their nipples pierced.  As a result of a surge of information claiming sexual enhancement with a pierced nipple, there has been a reported increase of men and women requesting this procedure.

Nipple piercing and breastfeeding
A common question among women who consider nipple piercings is how it may affect breastfeeding. There is no evidence to suggest that proper nipple piercings can cause any complications with lactation. A letter in the Journal of the American Medical Association suggests improperly pierced nipples and scarring may result in blocked ducts.

It is recommended that good care be taken to prevent infection by using a piercing professional and good body piercing aftercare. Frequent re-piercings can also damage the nipple and cause complications. It is also recommended that the piercing be healed before breastfeeding. Most body piercing professionals will refuse to pierce a pregnant woman for this reason and because piercing causes stress on the body that could potentially complicate a pregnancy.

Several complications have been noted involving breastfeeding with a piercing present, so it is recommended to remove nipple jewelry before nursing. Several complications resulting from nursing with nipple jewelry inserted can include poor latch, slurping, gagging, and milk leaking from the baby's mouth.

It can also be a potential choking hazard for the baby. As the baby sucks, the ends on a barbell (if worn) may come loose and could possibly lodge in the baby's throat (a captive bead ring, properly inserted, would lessen the risk of anything becoming loose, falling out, and lodging in the throat). The baby's gums and tongue as well as the soft and hard palate could be injured by the jewelry.

Whilst there are some arguments made against having a nipple piercing and breastfeeding, some experts state it is okay to pierce nipples.

Piercing of inverted nipples 
Inverted nipples are primarily a cosmetic problem but might interfere with breastfeeding. Nipples that are inverted can be pierced; in fact, it has been proposed as a corrective strategy to protract the nipple.

Potential complications

The nipple is fleshy enough to pierce securely behind plenty of skin to prevent rejection. However, if the jewelry gauge is too thin or the piercing is not deep enough to begin with, there is a risk of rejection. Metal allergies, infections, or excessive pulling/tugging can also cause the piercing to be rejected.

Death due to complications resulting from nipple piercings may have occurred, as have serious infections resulting in the removal of a breast after getting a nipple ring, but typically, a nipple piercing will take at least six months to a year for women or two to four months for men to heal fully.

There is an increased risk of nonpuerperal mastitis occurring in the months after nipple piercing.

Popular wearers
A nipple piercing gained considerable media attention after Super Bowl XXXVIII, during which Justin Timberlake accidentally exposed Janet Jackson's right breast on which she had a nipple shield applied to a piercing. This incident is humorously called Nipplegate. Nicole Richie set off an alarm at the Reno-Tahoe International Airport as she passed a metal detector with her nipple piercing. Pink had her nipple pierced backstage after a concert she was giving in Germany in the presence of her mother. The whole scene was filmed and later published on her DVD Pink: Live in Europe. Christina Aguilera had all her piercings removed except for her right nipple piercing.  Also, R&B singer Cassie has both of her nipples pierced.  Pictures of her breasts were posted on the Internet when someone hacked into her private photographs. Pop singer Rihanna had her nipple piercing exposed first in the same way and later in a Lui magazine pictorial. Hip-hop artist Ice Spice has mentioned having them in two of her songs.

See also
Genital piercing
Navel piercing
Nipple shield (jewelry)

References

External links 
 

Body piercing
Piercing